On April 12, 2005, at around 1 p.m. local time, a 50-year-old Iranian national seized a regular bus with a number of school children in the town of Ennepetal, Germany in the state of North Rhine-Westphalia.

The kidnapper entered the bus at a bus stop in the Voerde district of Ennepetal. Aboard the bus, the kidnapper threatened the driver and the passengers with kitchen knives, and tied a number of children together with some rope. He then dragged the tied-up children off the bus, at which point several children were able to flee. The man then pulled four girls aged between 11 and 16 into a nearby house, overpowering the house owner and dragging the four hostages into the cellar of the house. According to an eye witness, the hostage taker demanded to speak to the German authorities, asking for his family to be allowed to join him in Germany. However, no official contact could be established with the hostage taker.

At 6:12 p.m.,  police forces and a Spezialeinsatzkommando from the nearby city of Dortmund stormed the building, freeing the hostages. One of the hostages and the kidnapper sustained minor injuries.

See also
 List of hostage crises

2005 crimes in Germany
2000s in North Rhine-Westphalia
Crime in North Rhine-Westphalia
Hijacking
Hostage taking in Germany
Kidnappings in Germany
Terrorism in Germany